A training manual is a book or booklet of instructions, used to improve the quality of a performed task.  Training manuals are widely used, including in business and the military.

A training manual may be particularly useful as:
 an introduction to subject matter prior to training
 an outline to be followed during training
 a reference to subject matter after training
 a general reference document
 a system to reference

A training manual may form an important part of a formal training program. For example, it may help ensure consistency in presentation of content. It may also ensure that all training information on skills, processes, and other information necessary to perform tasks is together in one place.

Training manuals can be designed to be used as:
Work books – used in training sessions to provide basic information, examples and exercises.
Self-paced guides: designed for trainees to work through on their own.
Reference manuals: for containing detailed information on processes and procedures.
Handouts: provide general information to support training done during the session.
Job aids: provide step-by-step instructions to be used in the workplace.

Further reading
Work books
Self-paced guides (in German)
Reference manuals
Handouts
Job aids

See also
graphic training aids

Handbooks and manuals